Connecting... is an American television sitcom co-created and co-executive produced by Martin Gero and Brendan Gall for Universal Television. The series premiered on October 8, 2020 on NBC.

In November 2020, the series was canceled after four episodes. The remaining episodes were released on NBC.com and Peacock shortly after.

Premise
Set against the backdrop of the COVID-19 pandemic in the United States, the series follows the lives of a group of friends who try to stay connected via videotelephony as they navigate through the various nuances of life in a lockdown.

Cast

Main
Otmara Marrero as Annie
Parvesh Cheena as Pradeep
Keith Powell as Garrett
Jill Knox as Michelle
Shakina Nayfack as Ellis
Ely Henry as Rufus
Preacher Lawson as Ben

Recurring
Cassie Beck as Jazmin

Guest
Constance Marie as Martha

Episodes

Production
On June 26, 2020, it received a straight-to-series order of 8 episodes by NBC.

The first star to be cast in the series was Otmara Marrero on July 22, 2020, followed by Parvesh Cheena on July 31, 2020. The following month, Keith Powell, Jill Knox, Shakina Nayfack, Ely Henry and Preacher Lawson joined the main cast. Shakina Nayfack's casting made her the first transgender person to have a starring role on a major network comedy production.

On November 2, 2020, NBC canceled the series, amid dwindling viewership, after airing only four episodes and pulled it from the network's schedule, with reruns of Superstore taking its place. The remaining episodes were streamed exclusively on NBC.com and Peacock.

Release
On September 10, 2020, NBC released the first official trailer for the series. On August 27, 2020, it was announced that the series would be replacing Brooklyn Nine-Nine in NBC's previously announced Fall schedule and would premiere on October 1, 2020. On September 24, 2020, the series premiere was pushed by one week to October 8, 2020.

Reception
On Rotten Tomatoes, the series holds an approval rating of 67% with an average rating of 6.33/10, based on 9 reviews. On Metacritic, it has a weighted average score of 65 out of 100, based on 8 critics, indicating "generally favorable reviews".

References

External links
 
 

2020 American television series debuts
2020 American television series endings
2020s American sitcoms
English-language television shows
NBC original programming
Peacock (streaming service) original programming
Television series by Universal Television
Television shows about the COVID-19 pandemic
Television shows set in Los Angeles